Sunday's Best was an American emo band formed in 1997.

History

The band's start came at KXLU, Loyola Marymount University's famous college radio station, where guitarist Ian Moreno, singer/bassist Ed Reyes, and drummer Tom Ackerman (formerly of Skiploader) all worked at in the late 1990s. Moreno and Reyes started the band with singer/guitarist Pedro Benito, a friend of Reyes's, and recorded the band's first 7" single in 1998, before recruiting Ackerman to play drums. In 1999, they put out their first EP, the seven-song Where You Are Now, and in 2000, they followed with their first LP, Poised to Break, on Polyvinyl. In 2002, their second album The Californian appeared, showcasing the group's cleanest pop sound yet. The band slowly parted ways over the next few years, though frontman Ed Reyes and guitarist Ian Moreno have since started a new band, The Little Ones. Benito plays in The Jealous Sound while James Tweedy played in The Bronx. Tom Ackerman joined Post-Hardcore band, The Kite-Eating Tree.

Song usage in the media
Sunday's Best has appeared frequently in the Amped series of games, which were released on the Xbox. The songs featured include "Don't Let it Fade" and "Our Left Coast Ambitions," and are believed by fans of the band to "add new highs" to the gameplay. "Brave, but Brittle..." was featured in the Xbox game Amped 2. The song "Without Meaning" appears in the film Waiting... and many other tracks have appeared on the short-lived animated television shows Clone High USA and Undergrads. Sunday's Best have also been heard during Fox show The Loop, during the episode "Bear Drop Soup". The song featured in that episode is "Indian Summer". In the popular Gilmore Girls series "Saccharine" can be heard playing in the background of a party in the episode Keg!Max! from season three.

Discography
 Where You Are Now (EP) (1999, Crank! A Record Company)
 Poised to Break (2000, Polyvinyl)
 The Californian (2002, Polyvinyl)

External links
 Sunday's Best on Altsounds.com

1997 establishments in California
2003 disestablishments in California
Indie rock musical groups from California
Musical groups from Los Angeles
Musical groups established in 1997
Musical groups disestablished in 2003